Ronald "Ronni" Pieper (21 March 1948 – 26 August 2007) was a sailor from Switzerland. Pieper represented his country at the 1972 Summer Olympics in Kiel. Pieper took 20th place in the Soling with Hans Gut and Peter Gerber as fellow crew members.

References

1948 births
2007 deaths
Swiss male sailors (sport)
Sailors at the 1972 Summer Olympics – Soling
Olympic sailors of Switzerland